The strain hardening exponent (also called the strain hardening index), usually denoted , a constant often used in calculations relating to stress–strain behavior in work hardening. It occurs in the formula known as Hollomon's equation (after John Herbert Hollomon Jr.) who originally posited it as 

The value of the strain hardening exponent lies between 0 and 1, with a value of 0 implying a perfectly plastic solid and a value of 1 representing a perfectly elastic solid. Most metals have an -value between 0.10 and 0.50.

Tabulation

References

External links
 More complete picture about the strain hardening exponent in the stress–strain curve on www.key-to-steel.com

Mechanical engineering
Solid mechanics